Guterres is a Portuguese surname. Its Spanish variant is Gutiérrez. Notable people with the surname include:

Hermenegildo Guterres (9th–10th century AD), Galician noble
Adélio Guterres, Timor Lestean football player
Adalgisa Magno Guterres, East Timor politician
Aniceto Guterres Lopes, East Timor lawyer
António Guterres, Portuguese politician, Secretary-General of the United Nations
Éder Gaúcho (real name Éder Guterres Silveira), Brazilian professional footballer
Eurico Guterres, East Timor soldier
Francisco Guterres, East Timor politician
José Guterres Silva (born 1998), East Timor football player
José Luís Guterres, East Timor politician
Lionel Guterres (born 1931), Hong Kong field hockey player
Maria Ângela Guterres Viegas Carrascalão (born 1951), East Timor journalist, university teacher and former Minister of Justice  
Vicente Guterres, East Timor politician
Portuguese patronymic surnames

Surnames from given names